The University of Central Florida College of Nursing is an academic college of the University of Central Florida located in Orlando, Florida, United States. The dean of the college is Mary Lou Sole, PhD, RN, CCNS, CNL, FAAN, FCCM.

According to U.S. News & World Report, UCF is among the most innovative college programs, with one of the best online graduate nursing programs in the state of Florida and among the top 25 programs for Veterans.

History
The Nursing Program at UCF was established in 1978, with the first class of undergraduate students enrolling in the fall of 1979. The inaugural class graduated in 1981 with their BSN degree. In 1982, the Nursing program received the designation, Department of Nursing. A satellite campus was opened at Cocoa in 1983.

In 1986, the Department of Nursing moved to a larger space, including a larger laboratory, in the Health and Physics Building. The program's designation was changed to School of Nursing, within the College of Health and Public Affairs, in 1995. The same year, the Master of Science in Nursing (MSN) program began in the fall. In 1998, UCF created the state's fully online RN to BSN program. The year 2003 saw the launch of the nursing PhD program.

On July 1, 2007, the School of Nursing became the College of Nursing, UCF's twelfth college, to recognize its growth and stature. The following year, UCF Foundation established the Knightingale Society for alumni and friends of the college who provide annual contributions of $1,000 or more. In 2010, the College of Nursing moved to its current location in the University Tower building within Central Florida Research Park, adjacent to the main campus of UCF. Starting in 2014, the program was recognized by U.S. News & World Report as one of the nation's best online graduate programs, being ranked No. 24. In 2015, the College of Nursing launched the state's first online PhD program for nurse scientists.

Future
The college plans to move to a new building on the UCF Health Sciences Campus at Lake Nona by the end of the decade, enabling a closer partnership with the College of Medicine.

Nursing program
About 3,000 students are enrolled in the UCF College of Nursing. The GPA of admitted students ranges from 3.42 to 4.0.

Many students complete their nursing education through a partnership between UCF, Seminole State, and Valencia. Students earn an ASN degree from either Seminole or Valencia after 5 semesters, which also contributes five semesters' worth of coursework to a BSN through UCF. The NCLEX licensing exam is taken upon earning the ASN degree, in order to obtain an RN license. Students then transfer to UCF for two more semesters to complete the BSN degree.

References

External links
University of Central Florida College of Nursing
Florida Board of Nursing Licensing Requirements

Nursing
Nursing schools in Florida
Educational institutions established in 1979
1979 establishments in Florida